René Román Hinojo (born 15 December 1983), known simply as René, is a Spanish professional footballer who plays as a goalkeeper for CD Atlético Baleares.

Club career
Born in El Bosque, Cádiz, René made his senior debut with local Arcos CF in the 2002–03 season. He first arrived in the Segunda División B in the summer of 2006, signing with Racing Club Portuense.

In the following years, René continued competing in the third division and his native Andalusia, representing Betis Deportivo Balompié (being named to the first team's substitutes bench on three occasions), Unión Estepona CF and CP Cacereño. In July 2012 he signed with fellow third-tier FC Cartagena, being released the following month and remaining a free agent until January 2013, when he moved to Barakaldo CF.

On 21 July 2013, René joined Real Jaén, recently promoted to Segunda División. On 11 September, aged 29, he appeared in his first professional match, a 1–0 home win against CD Numancia in the second round of the Copa del Rey. He made his league debut on 20 October, in a 1–0 victory over AD Alcorcón also at the Nuevo Estadio de La Victoria.

On 16 July 2014, René moved to UE Llagostera also in division two. On 29 June 2016, after suffering relegation, he joined Girona FC of the same league after agreeing to a two-year deal.

René contributed 21 appearances during the season, sharing starting duties with Bono as the Catalan club achieved promotion to La Liga for the first time ever. He left on 5 July 2017, and signed a two-year contract with UD Almería just hours later.

On 22 May 2019, having been an undisputed first choice, René renewed his contract at the Estadio de los Juegos Mediterráneos for a further two years. The following 22 January, however, he was loaned to SD Ponferradina also of the second division for the remainder of the campaign.

René cut ties with Almería on 11 September 2020. The 36-year-old moved abroad for the first time in his career later that month, agreeing to a two-year deal at Romania's FC Dinamo București. He left in December, due to unpaid wages.

References

External links

1983 births
Living people
People from Sierra de Cádiz
Sportspeople from the Province of Cádiz
Spanish footballers
Footballers from Andalusia
Association football goalkeepers
Segunda División players
Segunda División B players
Tercera División players
Primera Federación players
Divisiones Regionales de Fútbol players
Arcos CF players
Racing Club Portuense players
Betis Deportivo Balompié footballers
CP Cacereño players
FC Cartagena footballers
Barakaldo CF footballers
Real Jaén footballers
UE Costa Brava players
Girona FC players
UD Almería players
SD Ponferradina players
CD Atlético Baleares footballers
Liga I players
FC Dinamo București players
Spanish expatriate footballers
Expatriate footballers in Romania
Spanish expatriate sportspeople in Romania